Chen Wen-chieh (born 29 August 1992) is a Taiwanese footballer who currently plays as a defender for the national and club level for Taiwan Steel.

International goals

References

1992 births
Living people
Taiwanese footballers
Chinese Taipei international footballers
Tatung F.C. players
Taiwanese expatriate footballers
Expatriate footballers in China
Hunan Billows players
China League One players
Association football defenders
Footballers from Tainan